Anisacanthus trilobus is a plant native to the Caatinga vegetation and Cerrado vegetation of Brazil.

External links
 Anisacanthus trilobus

Acanthaceae
Endemic flora of Brazil
Flora of the Cerrado